USCGC Hollyhock (WAGL-220) was the lead ship of the Hollyhock-class buoy tender built in 1937 and operated by the United States Coast Guard. The ship was named after an annual, biennial, or perennial plant usually taking an erect, unbranched form.

Construction and career 
Hollyhock was laid down by the Defoe Boat & Motor Works, in Bay City, Michigan on 13 April 1936, after construction was authorized in 1934. She was launched on 24 March 1937 and later commissioned on 7 August 1937, assigned to the 12th Lighthouse District in Milwaukee. She was relocated to Sturgeon Bay during World War II and designated WAGL-220.

In 1954, she was refitted with diesel engines. On 15 October 1954, she was dispatched to assist the collision between Dutch M/V Prins Willem V and tugboat Sinclair No.12. From 1 July 1958 until 14 September 1959. From 19 to 21 November, she assisted the M/V Carl D. Bardley in northern Lake Michigan. Hollyhock was transferred to Detroit, Michigan on 15 September 1959.

During the 1980 Mariel Boatlift, she participated in Coast Guard operations off Florida. Her purpose in Florida was to be responsible for buoys and aids to navigation in the Miami area. Hollyhock was decommissioned on 31 March 1982, due to budgetary issues and was later sold to a Mission Co. as Good News. Due to mechanical problems, she was stranded and towed to the Miami River, to be sold to the Florida Boating Improvement Program to become an artificial reef.

on 20 February 1990, she was sunk as an artificial reef off Pompano Beach, Florida. Her wreck lies in the Rodeo Reef and has been renamed "The Wreck of Captain Dan", in honor of Captain Dan Garnsey.

Legacy 
A later buoy tender, USCGC Hollyhock (WLB-214) was built in 2003 and named after the buoy tender Hollyhock which was decommissioned in 1982.

Awards 

 National Defense Service Medal 
 Coast Guard Unit Commendation
 Humanitarian Service Medal

References

United States Coast Guard: Hollyhock
South Florida Diving: CAPTAIN DAN

External links 
 TogetherWeServed: Hollyhock Crew Members

Hollyhock
1937 ships
Ships built in Michigan
Ships sunk as artificial reefs
Maritime incidents in 1990
Shipwrecks of the Florida coast